Richard Hellie (May 8, 1937 – April 24, 2009) was an American historian.

Richard Hellie was born in Waterloo, Iowa, on May 8, 1937, to Ole Hellie and Elizabeth Larsen. His mother was a schoolteacher, and his father was a journalist. Ole worked successively for newspapers in Minnesota, Wisconsin, Missouri, Nebraska, and Iowa before joining the Des Moines Register in 1941, where he covered Nazi war crimes. Richard Hellie's interest in Russian history was sparked upon reading a children's book about Soviet partisans. He attended Theodore Roosevelt High School, where he played football. Following completion of the eleventh grade, Hellie enrolled at the University of Chicago. He completed a bachelor's degree in 1958, followed by a doctorate in 1965, and subsequently began teaching at Rutgers University. He returned to Chicago in 1966, and was later appointed Thomas E. Donnelly Professor in History. While on the faculty of the University of Chicago, Hellie served as editor of the journal Russian History for two decades. He died of complications from esophageal cancer at home in Hyde Park, Chicago, on April 24, 2009, aged 71.

Four scrapbooks about Harry S. Truman that Hellie created at the age of sixteen are held by the Harry S. Truman Presidential Library and Museum.

References

1937 births
2009 deaths
Writers from Waterloo, Iowa
Writers from Des Moines, Iowa
20th-century American male writers
20th-century American historians
American male non-fiction writers
21st-century American historians
21st-century American male writers
Historians of Russia
Deaths from cancer in Illinois
Deaths from esophageal cancer
Theodore Roosevelt High School (Iowa) alumni
Historians from Iowa